Kari-Keen Manufacturing Company was an American aircraft manufacturer and producer of automotive luggage.

Kari-Keen's automotive product line included the Kari-Keen Kairrier automotive trunks and beds designed by Paul Lier and patented in 1925. Production started in Leeds, Iowa. In 1937, the automotive division ceased operations.

Kari-Keen also operated a flight school to operate their aircraft, the Kari-Keen School of Aviation. In 1930 C.F. Lytle bought the assets of the aviation branch and formed Sioux aircraft. Only three prototype new models were built and retained the Kari-Keen logo on the tail.

Aircraft

References

Bibliography

Defunct aircraft manufacturers of the United States